Sarvadaman D. S. Chowla (22 October 1907 – 10 December 1995) was an Indian American mathematician, specializing in number theory.

Early life
He was born in London, since his father, Gopal Chowla, a professor of mathematics in Lahore, was then studying in Cambridge. His family returned to India, where he received his master's degree in 1928 from the Government College in Lahore. In 1931 he received his doctorate from the University of Cambridge, where he studied under J. E. Littlewood.

Career and awards
Chowla then returned to India, where he taught at several universities, becoming head of mathematics at Government College, Lahore in 1936. During the difficulties arising from the partition of India in 1947, he left for the United States. There he visited the Institute for Advanced Study until the fall of 1949, then taught at the University of Kansas in Lawrence until moving to the University of Colorado in 1952. He moved to Penn State in 1963 as a research professor, where he remained until his retirement in 1976. He was a member of the Indian National Science Academy.

Among his contributions are a number of results which bear his name. These include the Bruck–Ryser–Chowla theorem, the Ankeny–Artin–Chowla congruence, the Chowla–Mordell theorem, and the Chowla–Selberg formula, and the Mian–Chowla sequence.

Works

Notes

External links
 

American Hindus
1907 births
1995 deaths
20th-century Indian mathematicians
Indian number theorists
Alumni of Trinity College, Cambridge
British emigrants to the United States
University of Colorado faculty
University of Kansas faculty
Pennsylvania State University faculty
Government College University, Lahore alumni
English Hindus
British people of Indian descent
American academics of Indian descent